Leonard Charles Trump (23 April 1887 – 9 June 1948) was a Welsh international rugby union player, who later switched to professional rugby league. He played amateur club rugby predominantly for Newport, and played county rugby for Monmouthshire, and as a professional joined Hull Kingston Rovers.

Personal history
Born in Newport, Wales in 1887, Trump was part of an impressive sporting family. His brother-in-law was fellow Welsh international George Travers, whose son Bunner Travers also represented Wales. Trump served with the Royal Artillery during World War I. He worked for a potato merchant.

Rugby union career
Trump first came to note as a rugby player when he represented Pill Harriers RFC, a hard Monmouthshire docklands team who were a strong feeder club for Newport. Trump followed many past player, when he left the Harriers for Newport, becoming a regular forward member. During the 1911/12 season, he is recorded as being 'often outstanding' for the club. Trump made his début for Wales on 20 January 1912 against England as part of the Five Nations Championship. Trump would play in all four matches of the tournament, which saw home victories over Scotland and France, but loses away to England and Ireland.

International games played
Wales
  1912
  1912
  1912,
  1912

Bibliography

References

1887 births
1948 deaths
British Army personnel of World War I
Hull Kingston Rovers players
Monmouthshire County RFC players
Newport RFC players
Pill Harriers RFC players
Royal Artillery soldiers
Rugby league players from Newport, Wales
Rugby union players from Newport, Wales
Rugby union props
Wales international rugby union players
Welsh rugby league players
Welsh rugby union players